For Free is the eighth and final solo studio album by American musician David Crosby. The album was released on July 23, 2021, by Three Blind Mice and BMG Rights Management with cover art produced by Joan Baez.

The album was Crosby's final release prior to his death in January 2023.

Critical reception

For Free received generally positive reviews from critics. At Metacritic, which assigns a normalized rating out of 100 to reviews from critics, the album received an average score of 84, which indicates "universal acclaim", based on 6 reviews.

Track listing

Personnel 
 David Crosby – vocals 
 James Raymond – acoustic piano (1-5, 7, 8, 10), synthesizers (1-6, 8-10), synth guitar solo (1, 4), synth bass (1-3, 6, 9, 10), synth acoustic guitar (3, 8), drum programming (3), Fender Rhodes (4, 9), percussion (4), horn arrangements (4), Wurlitzer electric piano (6), backing vocals (8)
 Shawn Tubbs – guitars (1), acoustic guitar (6, 8), electric guitar (6, 8)
 Steve Postell – acoustic guitar (2), backing vocals (2), guitars (5)
 Greg Leisz – pedal steel guitar (2)
 Dean Parks – guitars (4), acoustic guitar (9), electric guitar (9)
 Andrew Ford – bass (4)
 Elijah Thomson – bass (8)
 Gary Novak – drums (1, 4-6, 9)
 Steve DiStanislao – drums (2, 10)
 Abe Laboriel Jr. – drums (8)
 Steve Tavaglione – tenor saxophone (4), EWI (10)
 Walt Fowler – trumpet (4), flugelhorn (4)
 Michael McDonald – backing vocals (1)
 Gracie Raymond – backing vocals (3)
 Becca Stevens – backing vocals (3)
 Michelle Willis – backing vocals (3, 6, 8)
 Sarah Jarosz – vocals (7)
 Brian Wilson – count-in vocal (10)

Production 
 James Raymond – producer, arrangements, recording, mixing 
 Dan Garcia – recording, mixing 
 David Crosby – mixing 
 Nate Hassely – assistant engineer 
 Joel Jacks – assistant engineer 
 Jason Mariani – assistant engineer 
 Kaushlesh "Garry" Purohit – assistant engineer
 Shawn Tubbs – guitar recording (1, 6, 8)
 Dean Parks – guitar recording (4, 9)
 Bernie Grundman – mastering 
 Louise Hendy – artwork design
 Joan Baez – sleeve artwork, original painting 
 Mike Chadwick – management 

Studios
 Recorded at The Bamboom Room (Altadena, California); Hz Werks (Van Nuys, California); Joel Jacks' Studio (Santa Ynez, California); Groove Masters (Santa Monica, California); Stubbs Recording (Spring Hill, Tennessee); Tomorrow's Sound Today (Memphis, Tennessee).
 Mixed at The Bamboom Room; Sunset Sound (Hollywood, California); Carbonite Sound (Ojai, California).
 Mastered at Bernie Grundman Mastering (Hollywood, California).

Charts

References

2021 albums
David Crosby albums
BMG Rights Management albums